Pietro Antoniani (Milan, circa 1740 - 1805) was an Italian painter, mainly of sea- and landscapes, often animated with figures, but also of historical subjects.

Biography
Like his Giacinto Gigante in the next generation, and appealing to British tastes, the exotic volcanic eruptions of Vesuvius were a popular subject for the artist. He was likely a pupil of Jacob Philipp Hackert and the precursors of the School of Posillipo.

References

18th-century Italian painters
Italian male painters
19th-century Italian painters
1740 births
1805 deaths
Painters from Naples
Italian landscape painters
19th-century Italian male artists
18th-century Italian male artists